Francisco Llanes (born 16 April 2002) is a Uruguayan tennis player.

Llanes represents Uruguay at the Davis Cup, where he has a W/L record of 1–0.

External links

2002 births
Living people
Uruguayan male tennis players
Tennis players at the 2019 Pan American Games
Pan American Games competitors for Uruguay